Renzulli is a surname of Italian origin. Notable people with the surname include:

Frank Renzulli (born 1959), American film actor, writer and producer
Joseph Renzulli (born 1936), American educational psychologist
Peter Renzulli (1895–1980), American soccer goalkeeper

References

Surnames of Italian origin